Charlotte Amalie may refer to:

Charlotte Amalie of Hesse-Kassel (or Hesse-Cassel) (1650–1714), queen-consort of Denmark and Norway
Princess Charlotte Amalie of Denmark (1706–1782), Danish princess, daughter of King Frederick IV
Charlotte Amalie, U.S. Virgin Islands, the capital city, which was named after the queen-consort
Charlotte Amalie High School, a high school in the aforementioned city